Silvana is a rural community and census-designated place (CDP) in Snohomish County, Washington, United States. Its population was 90 at the 2010 census.

Geography
Silvana is located on an island in the Stillaguamish River floodplain. The main channel of the river passes to the north of the island, while South Slough to the southwest and Cook Slough to the southeast also form the general boundaries of the community. It is located at  (48.202307, -122.255315). According to the United States Census Bureau, the CDP has a total area of 1.5 square miles (4.0 km2), all of it land.

Demographics
As of the census of 2000, there were 97 people, 38 households, and 27 families residing in the CDP. The population density was 63.2 people per square mile (24.3/km2). There were 42 housing units at an average density of 27.4/sq mi (10.5/km2). The racial makeup of the CDP was 93.81% White, 2.06% Native American, 4.12% from other races. Hispanic or Latino of any race were 6.19% of the population.

There were 38 households, out of which 31.6% had children under the age of 18 living with them, 52.6% were married couples living together, 10.5% had a female householder with no husband present, and 28.9% were non-families. 15.8% of all households were made up of individuals, and 5.3% had someone living alone who was 65 years of age or older. The average household size was 2.55, the average family size was 2.96.

In the CDP, the age distribution of the population shows 22.7% under the age of 18, 6.2% from 18 to 24, 36.1% from 25 to 44, 27.8% from 45 to 64, and 7.2% who were 65 years of age or older. The median age was 38 years.

The median income for a household in the CDP was $33,274, and the median income for a family was $33,810. Males had a median income of $68,750 versus $25,655 for females. The per capita income for the CDP was $21,070. None of the population or families were below the poverty line.

Notable people

Nels Bruseth, forest ranger, artist, and naturalist

Gallery

References

Census-designated places in Snohomish County, Washington
Census-designated places in Washington (state)